Corhiza is a genus of hydrozoans in the family Halopterididae.

Species
The following species are classed in this genus:
Corhiza bellicosa Millard, 1962
Corhiza complexa (Nutting, 1905)
Corhiza fascicularis (Allman, 1883)
Corhiza pannosa Millard, 1962
Corhiza pauciarmata Ansín Agís, Vervoort & Ramil, 2009
Corhiza scotiae (Ritchie, 1907)
Corhiza sociabilis Millard, 1980
Corhiza splendens Vervoort & Watson, 2003
Corhiza suensoni (Jäderholm, 1896)

References

Halopterididae
Hydrozoan genera